= Militant Minority =

2011 book written by Ben Isitt

Militant Minority: British Columbia Workers and the Rise of a New Left, 1948-72
- First edition
- Author: Ben Isitt
- Publisher: University of Toronto Press
- Publication date: 2011

Militant Minority: British Columbia Workers and the Rise of a New Left, 1948-72 is a 2011 book written by Ben Isitt and published by University of Toronto Press.
